The president of the United States has been chief of the executive branch of the United States of America since 1789.

Various other countries that are or were known as the United States have or had a presidential system:
President of the United Mexican States
President of the United States of Brazil (1937–1967)
President of the United States of Colombia (1863–1886)
President of the United States of Indonesia (1949–1950)
President of the United States of Venezuela (1864–1953)

POTUS, an abbreviation for "President of the United States", may also refer to:
P.O.T.U.S., a political talk radio channel on Sirius XM Radio
POTUS: Or, Behind Every Great Dumbass Are Seven Women Trying to Keep Him Alive, a play by Selena Fillinger

The Presidents of the United States of America may also refer to:

The Presidents of the United States of America (band), an alternative rock band
The Presidents of the United States of America (album), the band's self-titled debut album

See also
APL (shipping company), a Singapore-based container and shipping company formerly known as American President Lines
List of presidents of the United States
List of presidents of the United States by previous experience
Lists of fictional presidents of the United States